The 2013 GP de Plouay will be the 13th running on the GP de Plouay, a women's road race in Plouay, France.

The number 3 of the 2013 UCI Road World Cup standings, Ellen van Dijk, did not participate in this race. After the race the top 3 of the UCI World Cup Standings remained the same. Marianne Vos won the World Cup, ahead of Emma Johansson and Ellen van Dijk.

General standings (top 10)

Source

Points standings

Individuals
World Cup individual standings after 8 of 8 races.

Source

Teams
World Cup Team standings after 8 of 8 races.

Source

References

External links

GP de Plouay
2013 in French sport
2013 UCI Women's Road World Cup